Bill Robinson (August 31, 1921 – June 25, 2008) was a Canadian ice hockey centreman who played for the 1941 Memorial Cup champion Winnipeg Rangers. He was born in Cartwright, Manitoba.

Awards and achievements
Turnbull Cup MJHL Championship (1941)
Memorial Cup Championship (1941)
Honoured Member of the Manitoba Hockey Hall of Fame

External links
Bill Robinson’s biography at Manitoba Hockey Hall of Fame

1921 births
2008 deaths
Canadian ice hockey centres
Harringay Racers players
Ice hockey people from Manitoba
New York Rovers players
Ottawa Senators (QSHL) players
People from Pembina Valley Region, Manitoba
Portage Terriers players
Quebec Aces (QSHL) players
Seattle Americans players
Seattle Ironmen players
Winnipeg Rangers players